Sterphus scutellata is a species of Hoverfly in the family Syrphidae.

Distribution
Guyana.

References

Eristalinae
Insects described in 1934
Diptera of South America
Taxa named by Charles Howard Curran